Renzo Palmer (20 December 1929 – 4 June 1988) was an Italian film, television and stage actor. He appeared in more than 60 films between 1957 and 1988.

Life and career 
Born in Milan as Lorenzo Bigatti, Palmer was the adopted son of the stage actress Kiki Palmer (from which, born Giulia Fogliata, he inherited his stage name). After leaving his law studies, he debuted in 1955 on radio, after being spotted at an audition for singers, and then worked for two years in the Company of Prose of "Radio Roma". In 1957 Palmer  made  his television debut with L'avaro, directed by Vittorio Cottafavi; the same year he also made his theatrical debut at the Piccolo Teatro in Milan, in the revue I pallinisti. From then, even continuing to appear in prestigious stage works it was the television that assured him popularity and professional satisfaction, thanks to the numerous successful television films and TV series in which he starred.

Palmer was also a versatile film character actor, mainly active in commedia all'italiana and in poliziotteschi film genre.  He also was a radio and television host, and a popular voice actor. He died of cancer in Milan at 58.

Selected filmography

 La donna del giorno (1957) - Giorgio Salustri (voice, uncredited)
 Who Hesitates is Lost (1960) - Cavicchioni
 Un dollaro di fifa (1960) - Smile
 The Lovemakers (1961) - (uncredited)
 Totòtruffa 62 (1961) - Baldassarre
 The Fascist (1961) - Partisan Taddei
 Battle of the Worlds (1961) - Barrington
 Pugni pupe e marinai (1961) - Marco Pennacchiotti
 Obiettivo ragazze (1963)
 Son of the Circus (1963) - Paper, the pianist
 Revenge of the Musketeers (1963)
 Shivers in Summer (1964) - Barsanti
 The Visit (1964) - Conductor
 Cavalca e uccidi (1964) - Pastor Andrews
 La ragazza in prestito (1964)
 Con rispetto parlando (1965)
 Seven Golden Men (1965)
 Seven Golden Men Strike Again (1966) - (uncredited)
 The Mona Lisa Has Been Stolen (1966) - Le voleur de tableaux
 Europa canta (1966) - Sheriff Toro
 Web of Violence (1966) - Commissioner
 La volpe e le camelie (1966)
 Danger: Diabolik (1968) - Mr. Hammond - Second Minister of the Interior
 A Minute to Pray, a Second to Die (1968) 
 Spirits of the Dead (1968) - Priest (segment "William Wilson")
 House of Cards (1968) - Pietro Rossi - the false monk
 Buona Sera, Mrs. Campbell (1968) - Mayor
 Detective Belli (1969) - Commissioner Baldo
 Eagles Over London (1969) - Sgt. Donald Mulligan
 Dead of Summer (1970) - Alexandre Grasse (voice, uncredited)
 The Eroticist (1972) - Father Lucion
 Sting of the West (1972) - Rags Manure
 Massacre in Rome (1973) - Giorgio
 Rugantino (1973) - Cardinal Severini
 Street Law (1974) - Police Inspector
 White Fang to the Rescue (1974) - RCMP Sergeant
 Nipoti miei diletti (1974) - Menico
 How to Kill a Judge (1975) - Vincenzo Terrasini
 Go Gorilla Go (1975) - Gaetano Sampioni
 Soldier of Fortune (1976) - Fra' Ludovico da Rieti
 The Big Racket (1976) - Giulti
 The Cassandra Crossing (1976) - Train Station Ticket Collector (uncredited)
 Cross Shot (1976) - Maselli
 The Cynic, the Rat and the Fist (1977) - Commissioner Astalli
 Il mostro (1977)
 Ligabue (1977, TV Mini-Series) - Mayor
 Goodbye & Amen (1978) - Parenti
 La dottoressa preferisce i marinai (1981) - Captain Carlo Morelli
 The Salamander (1981) - Carabinieri Major Giorgione
 The Family (1987) - Uncle Nicola (old)

References

External links

1929 births
1988 deaths
Italian adoptees
Italian male film actors
Male actors from Milan
Deaths from cancer in Lombardy
20th-century Italian male actors